Kaber may refer to:

 a variant spelling for caber

People 
 Kaber (Jubilees), a person named in the Book of Jubilees

Place 
 Kaber, Cumbria